Nathan Beard (born March 9, 1978) is an American politician who served in the Missouri House of Representatives from the 52nd district from 2015 to 2019.

References

1978 births
Living people
Republican Party members of the Missouri House of Representatives
21st-century American politicians